The NAIA Men's Indoor Track and Field Championship is the annual track meet to determine the national champions of NAIA men's indoor track and field in the United States and Canada. It has been held annually since 1966.

The most successful program is Azusa Pacific, with 8 NAIA national titles (APU has subsequently joined the NCAA).

Results

Total Championships

 Schools highlight in yellow have reclassified athletics from the NAIA.

See also
NAIA Track and Field
NAIA Men's Outdoor Track and Field Championship
NAIA Women's Indoor Track and Field Championship
NAIA Women's Outdoor Track and Field Championship
NCAA Track and Field
NCAA Men's Indoor Track and Field Championships (Division I, Division II, Division III)
NCAA Women's Indoor Track and Field Championships (Division I, Division II, Division III)
NCAA Men's Outdoor Track and Field Championships (Division I, Division II, Division III)
NCAA Women's Outdoor Track and Field Championships (Division I, Division II, Division III)

References

External links
NAIA Men's Indoor Track and Field

College track and field competitions in the United States
Indoor track